Golpe de Sorte (Lucky Break) was a Portuguese series which began airing on SIC on 27 May 2019 and ended in 20 February 2021.

The series stars Maria João Abreu, Dânia Neto, Jorge Corrula, Diana Chaves , Pedro Barroso , Madalena Almeida  and Diogo Martins .

Plot 
The once quiet village of Alvorinha is suddenly put on the map when Maria do Céu (Maria João Abreu) wins the lottery. She is now one of the richest women in the country and everyone celebrates her victory.
A hard working widow, dear to everyone in town, up until now she made a humble living selling fruit at the market, to support her two children Bruno (Ângelo Rodrigues) and Telma (Isabela Valadeiro) while helping her parents.

Telma is good-hearted but is naïve and dreams of fame. She will be ecstatic when she realizes she is rich and will be able to satisfy all her materialistic fantasies. She will fall in love with journalist Ricardo (António Camelier).
Bruno is the opposite, responsible and hardworking. He will have to deal with several challenges, being the biggest girlfriend Jessica's (Carolina Carvalho) betrayal and finding out if he is the father of the child she carries.

Now that she has money, Céu's goals are to allow her family live a good life and find her missing son Rafael.
As a pregnant teen the newborn was taken away from her when childhood sweetheart Zé Luís (José Raposo) and her family were manipulate by Preciosa (Manuela Maria), Zé's mother, to give up the baby for adoption.

Con artists (now Miriam (Dânia Neto) and Jorge (Jorge Corrula)) hear the news and decide their next lucky break is Maria do Céu's millions. They were raised together in a catholic foster home and became professional scammers and fortune hunters. Manipulative and masters of disguise they have been able to get away with their crimes for many years.

One of their biggest score happened in 2006, when they led Fernando Craveiro (Rogério Samora) to bankruptcy. In desperation, the businessman plans to kill the scammers, leaving a letter to his daughter Leonor (Diana Chaves), explaining everything that happened, but dies in a car accident without being able to take revenge.
Leonor's world collapses with her father's death and the desire for revenge puts her on a mission to seek those who destroyed her family's life.

Thirteen years later, she finally traces them down in Alvorinha. In her new identity, she is now Alice Barreto.
She will team up with Ricardo to expose the charlatans and deal with the jealousy of Miriam, as her plan of approach will be to charm Jorge.

Maria do Céu will welcome Miriam and Jorge into her world.
Little does she know she is they will open a pandora's box, while burning a hole in her pocket.

Cast

Main Cast

Recurrent Cast

Guest Cast

Child Cast

Artistas Convidados

Series overview

References

External links

Portuguese-language television shows
2019 Portuguese television series debuts
2021 Portuguese television series endings
Sociedade Independente de Comunicação telenovelas
Portuguese television series